Nothing But Thirty is a 2020 Chinese drama television series directed by Zhang Xiaobo and starring Jiang Shuying, Tong Yao and Mao Xiaotong. The series follows the story of three vastly different urban women who have reached their thirties while facing challenges at a crucial stage in their lives, as they leave behind their youthful, carefree 20s to embrace the "adult" life of a 30-year-old, and ultimately decide to take matters into their own hands. The series began airing on Dragon Television and Tencent Video on July 17, 2020.

Plot
The story chronicles the life of three women with different backgrounds and different personalities.

Gu Jia is strong willed, and is both a housewife and a businesswoman. She helped her husband become the CEO of a fireworks company, and fought rich housewives who bullied her son. Wang Manni is rebellious, and is confident at both her workplace and at home. Zhong Xiaoqin is content with her average life, with a normal job and a husband who likes fish.

However, their lives are suddenly disrupted by external factors. Gu Jia begins to suspect her husband Xu Huanshan of having a young mistress, Wang Manni faces difficulties with sales and relationships, and Zhong Xiaoqin's idea of a perfect marriage is destroyed. How will the three women deal with the challenges of turning thirty?

Additionally a couple with a son close in age to Gu Jia's son Ziyan, who operate a food truck appear as silent characters. They occasionally interact with the main character and consistently appear at the end of the show before the closing credits.

Cast

Main
Jiang Shuying as Wang Manni, a senior sales person at Mishil.
Tong Yao as Gu Jia, wife of Xu Huanshan. She is intelligent and determined. 
Mao Xiaotong as Zhong Xiaoqin, an employee at a property management company. Wife of Chen Yu.

Supporting
Yang Le as Chen Yu, executive editor of the Breaking News Department of a TV station. The husband of Zhong Xiaoqin.
Li Zefeng as Xu Huanshan, a nerdy designer and then the CEO of a fireworks company, husband of Gu Jia.
Yang Lixin as Gu Jinghong, Gu Jia's father. 
Yan Zidong as Zhong Xiaoyang, Zhong Xiaoqin's boyfriend.
Edward Ma as Liang Zhengxian, an Asian-American businessman and playboy, boyfriend of Wang Manni.
Zhang Yue as Lin Youyou (林有有), an amusement park employee and Xu Huanshan's mistress.
Mao Yi as Jiang Chen, owner of a café and Wang Manni's former boyfriend.
Wang Zijian as Zhang Zhi Director of Quzhou's local government and Wang Manni's boyfriend.
Samantha Ko as Zhao Jingyu, Liang Zhengxian's fiancée.
Dai Jiaoqian as Miss Lu, Chen Yu's superior.
Yang Xinming as Uncle Yu, a barber in Quzhou.
Yang Yuting as Mrs. Wang, a wealthy woman who is friends with Gu Jia.
Cai Die as Xiao Bai
Fu Miao as Boss 
Walley Wei as Zoe 
Wiyona Yeung Lau Ching as Amanda, a Hong Kong salesperson at Mishil.
Tian Yitong as Daisy, the assistant head salesperson at Mishil.
Wang Renjun as father of Shen Jie, friend of Xu Huanshan, own a fireworks company.

Production 
The name "Sān Shí Ér Yǐ" based on a sentence "As thirty, I stood firm" comes from Analects.

Reception
Nothing But Thirty received mainly positive reviews. Douban gave the drama 7.4 out of 10.

Ratings 

 Highest ratings are marked in red, lowest ratings are marked in blue

Awards and nominations

References

External links

2020 Chinese television series debuts
2020 Chinese television series endings
Chinese drama television series
Television series by Linmon Pictures
Tencent original programming